The International Renaissance Foundation (IRF) (Ukrainian: Міжнародний фонд "Відродження") is a Ukrainian NGO founded by George Soros

It was founded in April 1990. IRF is an integral part of the Open Society Foundations which incorporates national and regional foundations in more than thirty countries around the world, primarily in Central and Eastern Europe, as well as the former Soviet Union. These foundations share a common goal of supporting educational, social and legal initiatives that promote the development and establishment of an open society.

IRF is one of Ukraine's largest charity organization. Its main objective is to provide financial and operational assistance to the development of an open and democratic society in Ukraine by supporting key civic initiatives in this area.

Over the period from 1990 to 2010 the International Renaissance Foundation supported numerous Ukrainian non-governmental organizations, community groups, academic and cultural institutions, publishing houses etc. in the amount of over $100 million.

Key areas 
The International Renaissance Foundation (IRF), finances projects and programs which foster the development of civil society, promote rule of law and independent mass media. Funds are also allocated for diversification of information resources for the third sector, democratization of education and public health, advancing of social capital and academic publications, as well as ensuring protection of national minorities rights and their integration into Ukrainian society.

IRF is providing financial support to the projects that encourage European integration, strengthening the impact of civil society and its control over the government, the system of civic protection of rights and establishment of the rule of law in Ukraine, penitentiary reform, civic activities of ethnic minorities, educational and public health reforms, publishing activities etc.

IRF's Executive Board and Program Boards determine the program priorities. Composed of prominent public figures and experts, the Boards address IRF's key action areas: civil society, rule of law, education, mass media, health care etc. As the chief civic structure within IRF, it elaborates the general strategy for the entire organization.

Transparency 
IRF keeps public informed of its programs and their implementation through publications in print media, by holding news conferences and presentations, via the Internet etc. Foundation employees, as well as its regional information partners consult public on IRF-supported projects and grants.

Principles 
IRF makes its grants only to non-governmental organizations. As a rule, the International Renaissance Foundation announces project competitions in advance. Grants are made to Ukrainian organizations whose projects meet the priorities of the competitions. At the same time, IRF considers applications of citizens regarding the financing of various projects, whose aims meet the Foundation’s objectives. Apart from making grants to other organizations, IRF conducts its own operational activities by implementing projects in priority action areas.

IRF finances national programs from its budget upon the recommendations of the Executive Board and Program Boards. The Foundation's experience in Ukraine and its close cooperation with other donor organizations in Central and Eastern Europe make it possible to monitor changes in Ukrainian society. Moreover, IRF attempts to predict these changes. IRF program activities are predominantly oriented to the European experience.

See also
Ukraine Crisis Media Center
Open Society Foundations
George Soros

References

External links 
 

Charities based in Ukraine
Foundations based in Ukraine
Non-profit organizations based in Ukraine
George Soros